The Hongta Hotel Shanghai is in the Pudong District of Shanghai, China. Opened in 2001 as under the St. Regis Hotels & Resorts franchise but currently operating as part of The Luxury Collection, tt contains 328 rooms and suites, is 37 stories tall and has  of space. The hotel was designed by Sydness Architects.

When it was the St. Regis Shanghai Hotel, it was rated 15th in the hotels of Asia in Condé Nast Publications's Traveler Readers' Choice.

References

External links
 

Hotel buildings completed in 2001
Hotels established in 2001
Hotels in Shanghai
The Luxury Collection